Democrats for Responsibility, Solidarity and Tolerance is a liberal and centrist political party in Bulgaria, mainly representing the Turkish minority. The party is led by Lyutvi Mestan.

Mestan, a long-time politician and member of the National Assembly of Bulgaria for Kardzhali, served as chairman of the Movement for Rights and Freedoms (DPS), the main Turkish party in Bulgaria, from January 2013 to 24 December 2015. He was removed as party leader by the DPS central council and expelled from the party for what was considered an excessively pro-Turkish government stance following the downing of a Russian bomber jet by the Turkish Air Force.

Mestan and his followers within the DPS subsequently founded a new party, DOST.

In the 2017 parliamentary election the party obtained 2.9% of the vote (21.6% in Kardzhali) and no seat as it failed to meet the 4% electoral threshold.

References

Liberal parties in Bulgaria
Centrist parties in Bulgaria
Political parties of minorities
Turkish political parties
Turkish diaspora in Europe